Jaime Mancisidor Lasa (born 7 April 1910, date of death unknown) was a Spanish footballer who played as a defender.

Career
Born in Irun, Mancisidor played for Real Unión and Real Sociedad. He also played for Girondins ASP in the 1941 Coupe de France Final.

References

1910 births
Year of death missing
Spanish footballers
Sportspeople from Irun
Real Unión footballers
FC Girondins de Bordeaux players
Real Sociedad footballers
Footballers from the Basque Country (autonomous community)
Association football defenders